John Greer  (born 1944) is a Canadian sculptor who likes to bring cultural and natural history together. One critic calls him one of Canada's most philosophically minded artists. He looks to ancient Celtic stones and Greek sculpture for inspiration. Greer was the catalyst behind "Halifax Sculpture," a 1990s movement, rooted in minimalism and conceptualism.

Life and work
Born in Amherst, Nova Scotia, Greer studied Fine Art from 1962 to 1967 in Halifax at the Nova Scotia School of Art (1963-1964), at the Montreal Museum of Fine Arts school (sculpture, 1966) and at the Vancouver School of Art (painting, 1967). He has exhibited his work since 1967 extensively in Canada, USA, Korea and Europe. He taught sculpture at NSCAD University in Halifax for 26 years and is based in LaHave, Nova Scotia, and Pietrasanta, Italy. He views sculpture as his language and tries to engage the viewer in his work. Greer has had the admiration of his artist-peers for many years, as the following quote from Ron Shuebrook, writing in 1987, suggests.
...it is Greer's carved marble and cast bronze sculptures that confirm his place as one of the most compellingly thoughtful and accomplished sculptors at work in Canada.

His exhibits include:

 Origins, 1995 is permanently installed in the Ondaatje courtyard of the Art Gallery of Nova Scotia.
 Gathering, 2001, adjacent to the National Museum in Yongsan Family Park in Seoul, Korea.
 Reflection, 2001, the Monument to Canadian Aid Workers memorial to Canadian Aid Workers in Ottawa, Canada.
 Reflecting on Culture in Halifax, NS in 2006.
 Alluding to Allusion April, 2008 in Brookhaven College, Farmers Branch, Texas.
 
In 2009, he installed the piece Humble Ending in La Serpara, a sculpture garden North of Rome. He held the solo exhibition of APPRÉHENSION - APPREHENSION at Galerie Samuel Lallouz in Montreal, PQ in 2009. In 2011, his work The Sirens was permanently installed in a private park in Switzerland. The large-scale installation Cradle was completed in the spring of 2012 for the same private collection. In 2014, Greer co-founded “Intercontinental Sculpture Inc.”, in order to be able to handle more successfully the business part of creating art for the public domain.

The Art Gallery of Nova Scotia had a major travelling retrospective of Greer's work, retroActive, curated by David Diviney, which opened in 2015. A reviewer wrote that the real story of this exhibition was that Greer changed from being a sculptor whose work was based on theory to being one who was object-based. In 2017, he installed The Rule of Law is a Reflection of Us All in the McMurtry Gardens of Justice in Toronto. Also in 2017, he created the Canadian Building Trades Unions Monument, a collaboration with architect Brian MacKay-Lyons, for the Canadian Building Trades Unions which is now located in the collection of the National Capitol Collection in Ottawa. It won the "Award of Merit: Public Places and Civic Spaces" in the Urban Design Awards of the city of Ottawa.

Greer is the recipient of numerous awards and grants; in 2009, he received the one of the prestigious Governor General's Awards in Visual and Media Arts in recognition of his lifetime achievement and significant contribution to contemporary Canadian visual art. He received the Victor Martyn Lynch-Staunton Award (1998) from the Canada Council for the Arts and first prize at the 1991 International Sculpture Symposium, "Matière à Musée" in Montreal.

Greer was a founding member of one of Canada's first artist-run centres (Eyelevel Gallery), and is a long-term supporter of CARFAC (Canadian Artists' Representation/Le Front des artistes Canadiens).

Honours 
 Victor Martyn Lynch-Staunton Award (1987)
Royal Canadian Academy of Arts
Governor General's Award in Visual and Media Arts

References

Bibliography

External links
John Greer
Gallery 1.1.1

20th-century Canadian sculptors
Canadian male sculptors
20th-century Canadian male artists
21st-century Canadian sculptors
21st-century Canadian male artists
Living people
Academic staff of NSCAD University
Members of the Royal Canadian Academy of Arts
Place of birth missing (living people)
Governor General's Award in Visual and Media Arts winners
1944 births
People from Amherst, Nova Scotia
Artists from Nova Scotia